Mount Andes is a peak, 2,525 m, in the southeast part of the Tapley Mountains. Mapped by United States Geological Survey (USGS) from ground surveys and U.S. Navy air photos, 1960–63. Named by Advisory Committee on Antarctic Names (US-ACAN) for Lieutenant Commander Paul G. Andes, U.S. Navy, pilot at McMurdo Station, 1962–63 and 1963–64.

Mountains of Marie Byrd Land